The United States women's national rugby union team has played 38 matches at the Women's Rugby World Cup, from the inaugural tournament in 1991 to 2017. They have competed in every edition of the Rugby World Cup and have made it to the finals three times. The Eagles won the inaugural competition in 1991 and were runners-up in 1994, and 1998.

By position

1991 Rugby World Cup

Knockout stage

1994 Rugby World Cup

Knockout stage

1998 Rugby World Cup

Knockout stage

2002 Rugby World Cup

Knockout stage

2006 Rugby World Cup 

Pool B ⇔ Pool C

Knockout stage

2010 Rugby World Cup

Knockout stage

2014 Rugby World Cup

Knockout stage

2017 Rugby World Cup

Knockout stage

Overall record 
Overall record against all nations in the World Cup:

References

External links 

 Official site of the Rugby World Cup.
 Official site of World Rugby.

 
World Cup